Burleigh Heads Soccer Club is a semi-professional soccer club based in Burleigh Heads, Queensland, Australia. The club play in the Football Queensland Premier League 3 − South Coast, the top flight of the Football Queensland South Coast administrative division and the fifth flight of the Australian soccer league system. The club have won 5 premierships, 5 championships and 2 President's Cups within the division. 

The club was founded in 1981 from the remnants of the Pacific Colts (at the time the Senior team of  Palm Beach Soccer Club), where it competed within the Gold Coast first division and was an inaugural member of the Gold Coast Premier League in 1991. The club's home ground is the Pizzey Park.

Honours

Football South Coast 

 FQPL 3 − South Coast / Gold Coast Premier League
 Premiership
 Winners (5): 2001, 2004, 2006, 2007, 2019
 Championship
 Winners (5): 2003, 2004, 2007, 2008, 2019
 President's Cup
 Winners (2): 2001, 2006

References

External links
 
 

Association football clubs established in 1981
1981 establishments in Australia
Burleigh Heads, Queensland
Soccer teams on the Gold Coast, Queensland